William Earl Collins (born July 13, 1943) is a Canadian former professional ice hockey centre who played in the National Hockey League (NHL) for the Minnesota North Stars, Montreal Canadiens, Detroit Red Wings, St. Louis Blues, New York Rangers, Philadelphia Flyers, and Washington Capitals between 1967 and 1978.

Collins was born in Ottawa, Ontario.

Career statistics

Regular season and playoffs

External links
 

1943 births
Living people
Baltimore Clippers players
Canadian ice hockey centres
Detroit Red Wings players
Ice hockey people from Ottawa
Minnesota North Stars players
Minnesota Rangers players
Montreal Canadiens players
New York Rangers players
Philadelphia Flyers players
St. Louis Blues players
St. Paul Rangers players
Toronto Marlboros players
Washington Capitals players
Whitby Mohawks players